Robert Cole Williams (born October 2, 1962) is a former American football cornerback in the National Football League for the Dallas Cowboys and Kansas City Chiefs. He played college football at Baylor University.

Early years
Williams attended Ball High School, where he played at running back. He was also a long jumper, ran on all relay teams, and was a standout hurdler. He won the district high hurdles title as a senior.

He accepted a football scholarship from Baylor University, to play under head coach Grant Teaff. He redshirted his freshman year and was a backup running back behind Walter Abercrombie and Alfred Anderson in his first 2 seasons. 

As a junior, he was a backup behind Ron Francis and Ralph Stockemer. He was a backup behind Derrick McAdoo as a senior, but was able to have his best season making 58 carries for 208 yards, 14 receptions for 183 yards and being used as a wide receiver in some passing situations. He finished his college career with 119	carries for 410 yards, 19 receptions for 210 yards and one touchdown.

Professional career

Washington Redskins (first stint)
Williams was signed as an undrafted free agent by the Washington Redskins after the 1986 NFL Draft on May 3, with the intention of converting him into a wide receiver. He played in just two pre-season games before he was waived on August 4.

Dallas Cowboys
The Dallas Cowboys were intrigued by his combination of size and speed, and signed him as a free agent prior to the 1987 season. Head coach Tom Landry planned to turn Williams into a defensive back to take advantage of his speed. He was released on September 7.

After the players went on a strike on the third week of the season, those contests were canceled (reducing the 16 game season to 15) and the NFL decided that the games would be played with replacement players. Williams was re-signed to be a part of the Cowboys replacement team, that was given the mock name "Rhinestone Cowboys" by the media. He started at right cornerback and played well enough during those contests that the Cowboys kept him on for the rest of the season. He was mainly as a backup and a special teams player, also seeing time at linebacker on passing situations. He finished with 26 tackles, one pass defensed and one fumble recovery. 

In 1988, former Baylor teammate Ron Francis entered the season as the starter at right cornerback, before dislocating his left shoulder during an intrasquad game in pre-season. The injury allowed Williams to win the position outright. He recorded 60 tackles, 2 interceptions (tied for the team lead) and 19 passes defensed (second on the team). In the fifteenth game, a 24-17 win against the Washington Redskins, he had 4 passes defensed and set up the winning touchdown with an interception at the Redskins 24 yard line. In the ninth game against the Phoenix Cardinals, he limited Roy Green to one reception for 7 yards and also had 3 passes defensed.

In 1989, he missed 3 games with a sprained left knee he suffered in the third game against the Washington Redskins. In the last 2 games he was benched in favor of Francis. He posted 70 tackles, 10 passes defensed (tied for the team lead) and one quarterback pressure. In the season opener against the New Orleans Saints he tied a career-high with 10 tackles. In eighth game against the Phoenix Cardinals he had 4 passes defensed. The next game against the Washington Redskins he had 3 passes defensed.

In 1990, he started the first 6 games at right cornerback, before being passed on the depth chart by Manny Hendrix. He played as a nickel back the rest of the season. Here registered 42 tackles, 6 passes defensed, 3 special teams tackles, one interception.

In 1991, he was a backup cornerback, starting 2 games at weakside linebacker against the Houston Oilers and Atlanta Falcons, who were employing run and shoot offenses at the time. He tallied 49 tackles, 9 special teams tackles, one interception, 4 passes defensed, one sack and 2 quarterback pressures. In the ninth game against the Phoenix Cardinals he had a block punt to set up a touchdown. In the tenth game against the Houston Oilers he had 10 tackles and returned a blocked punt for his first career touchdown.

In 1992, he was moved from cornerback to free safety during the offseason. In the second game against the New York Giants he returned a blocked punt for a 3-yard  touchdown. On September 21, he was placed on the injured reserve list because of a left knee injury. He returned on October 28, but was placed on recall waivers and claimed by the Phoenix Cardinals on October 30, where he failed a physical examination and was reacquired by the Cowboys on November 3. He was one of two players declared inactive for Super Bowl XXVII (the other was Alan Veingrad). He appeared in 9 games, collecting 7 tackles and one quarterback pressure. 

On October 12, 1993, he was released after playing in 4 games. Williams won two Super Bowl rings as a member of the Cowboys.

Kansas City Chiefs
On December 30, 1993, Williams signed as a free agent with the Kansas City Chiefs. He was cut on March 29, 1994.

Washington Redskins (second stint)
In August 1994, he signed with the Washington Redskins, but was waived after playing in two pre-season games on August 28. He would later announce his retirement.

Personal life
Williams is an assistant track coach and football coach at Jesuit College Preparatory School of Dallas. He goes by the nickname of “Doogie”

References

External links
NFL replacements part of history
Williams a Surprise for Hapless Cowboys
Former Baylor Teammates Fighting for Same Position

1962 births
Living people
Sportspeople from Galveston, Texas
Players of American football from Texas
American football cornerbacks
Baylor Bears football players
Dallas Cowboys players
Phoenix Cardinals players
Washington Redskins players
Kansas City Chiefs players
National Football League replacement players